Charles David Lubiniecki (born August 9, 1980), better known as Charlie David, is a Canadian actor, writer, director and producer, best known for the male lead in the LGBT horror series Dante's Cove. He has also worked as a TV host on a number of shows like F.Y.E!, SpyTV, Bump! and Crash Test Mommy.

He is the owner of Border2Border Entertainment, a production company of film, television, digital media and audio projects.

Biography 
Charlie David was born in Regina, Saskatchewan, and raised in Yorkton. His family is of Polish origin. During high school, David performed in the musical group Saskatchewan Express, a touring youth show. In 2000, he graduated from the Canadian College of Performing Arts in Victoria, British Columbia.

He then moved on to co-found the boy band 4Now, in which he played piano. The band performed around Canada and the United States and opened for acts including Destiny's Child, The Black Eyed Peas and Pink. The band released two recordings. Derek James, later to play opposite David in the film Mulligans, was also in the band.

David later turned his attention to hosting and acting. He hosted for E! Television, NBC, OUTtv, here! TV, Pink TV, EGO, and Life Network on such shows as F.Y.E! in 2002, SpyTV in 2001, Bump! in 2005-2012 and Crash Test Mommy in 2004-2005.

He appeared in the mini-series Terminal City in 2005 and received second billing in the gay movie A Four Letter Word (2007) and Kiss the Bride (2008).

David played the lead character of Toby in the LGBT horror series Dante's Cove. His character was portrayed in a monogamous and loving relationship with boyfriend Kevin (Gregory Michael). David said in an interview, "What was attractive [about the role] was for me to portray a gay relationship, in which it's not always a different guy every night. Many gays and lesbians do pursue—and have—loving relationships in which we are very committed to each other. I think that is what Toby brings to the show. He is kind of a voice of reason, and has a definite dedication to his boyfriend."

David has consciously chosen to be "out" as a gay man in his personal life and career.

David wrote the novel and screenplay and starred in the film Mulligans, which had its premiere at the Inside Out Film and Video Festival in Toronto in May 2007. Mulligans explores the theme of what happens to individuals and their families when a young man and his friend's father "come out".

In addition to the screenplay for Mulligans, David has also published a novelization of the film (2009), as well as the novel Boy Midflight (2009) and the short story collection Shadowlands (2010).

David starred in the independent film Judas Kiss as Zachary Wells, a washed-up filmmaker who returns to his peculiar alma mater, where he meets his younger self and gets the chance to change his troubled past so he can avoid a disturbing future.

In 2012 and 2013, David produced two documentaries, I'm a Stripper, which he also wrote and directed, and Positive Youth, about young people living with HIV.

In 2016 David directed and produced a new documentary I'm a Porn Star: Gay4Pay. It's a documentary about straight men who go Gay4Pay and answers questions like: "What motivates straight men to do gay porn?" and "Why might gay people be turned off if the man on screen looks, sounds, or behaves in a way that is identifiably queer?".

David currently lives in Montreal with his partner.

Filmography

Producer
2004: Is He... (short) (associate producer)
2008: Mulligans (executive producer, producer)
2008: For My Wife... (documentary) (executive producer)
2009: Beyond Gay: The Politics of Pride (documentary) (executive producer)
2009–2012: Bump! (TV series) (associate producer)
2011: Judas Kiss (executive producer)
 2012: Positive Youth (writer, director, producer)
 2013: I'm a Stripper (writer, director, producer)
 2013: I'm a Porn Star
 2016: I'm a Porn Star: Gay4Pay (director, producer)
2018: Drag Heals (director, producer)

Actor

Awards
David was honored by Out Magazine as one of the "Out 100" for Remarkable Contributions to Gay Culture in 2005.

References

External links
 
 
 Charlie David Fond – archival records at The ArQuives: Canada's LGBTQ2+ Archives

1980 births
Living people
Canadian gay actors
Canadian gay writers
Canadian male television actors
People from Yorkton
Canadian gay musicians
Canadian LGBT broadcasters
Canadian television personalities
Canadian male novelists
Canadian male short story writers
Film producers from Saskatchewan
21st-century Canadian male actors
21st-century Canadian novelists
Canadian LGBT novelists
LGBT film producers
LGBT television producers
Male actors from Regina, Saskatchewan
Musicians from Regina, Saskatchewan
Writers from Regina, Saskatchewan
Canadian male screenwriters
21st-century Canadian short story writers
21st-century Canadian male writers
21st-century Canadian screenwriters
20th-century Canadian LGBT people
21st-century Canadian LGBT people
Gay screenwriters
Gay novelists